"Sun Probe" is an episode of Thunderbirds, a British Supermarionation television series created by Gerry and Sylvia Anderson and filmed by their production company AP Films (APF) for ITC Entertainment. Written by Alan Fennell and directed by David Lane, it was first broadcast on 9 December 1965 on ATV Midlands as the 11th episode of Series One. It is the fourth episode in the official running order.

Set in the 2060s, the series follows the exploits of International Rescue, an organisation that uses technologically-advanced rescue vehicles to save human life. The main characters are ex-astronaut Jeff Tracy, founder of International Rescue, and his five adult sons, who pilot the organisation's main vehicles: the Thunderbird machines. In "Sun Probe", Thunderbirds 2 and 3 are launched to save a crew of astronauts whose spacecraft is locked on a collision course with the Sun.

Plot
At Cape Kennedy in Florida, Colonel Benson oversees the launch of Sun Probe, a three-man spacecraft designed to extract matter from the Sun. Sun Probe lifts off safely and its journey to the Sun passes without incident.

A week later, as Sun Probe nears its target, International Rescue watch live TV coverage of the mission from Tracy Island. Brains (voiced by David Graham) is absent from the proceedings as he is busy working on his latest invention, an artificially-intelligent humanoid robot called Braman. In space, solarnauts Harris, Asher and Camp fire a smaller probe through a solar prominence and succeed in capturing fragments of matter. However, by the time the probe returns to the main spacecraft, the intensifying radiation has caused Sun Probes retro-rockets to fail, locking it on a collision course with the Sun.

On TV, Benson implores International Rescue to save the crew. Alan and Scott (voiced by Matt Zimmerman and Shane Rimmer) suggest remote-firing Sun Probes rockets by radio beam from Thunderbird 3. Virgil (voiced by David Holliday) points out that Thunderbird 2 is more powerful and that it would be easier to transmit the signal from Earth. The team finally agree to launch a two-pronged rescue attempt. Alan, Scott and Tin-Tin (voiced by Christine Finn) blast off in Thunderbird 3 but their radio beam falls short of Sun Probe, forcing them to travel closer to the Sun than anticipated.

Having determined the optimal Earth-bound transmitting position to be in the Himalayas, Virgil and Brains take off in Thunderbird 2 carrying the Transmitter Truck. Landing on Mount Arkan, they align the truck's dish with Sun Probe but their transmission fails to reach the spacecraft.

Further attempts to transmit from Thunderbird 3 fail. With the crews of both Sun Probe and Thunderbird 3 growing delirious from the heat, Alan suggests that Tin-Tin overrun the power and the beam finally makes contact, successfully firing Sun Probes retros. Sun Probe reverses course for Earth but the crew of Thunderbird 3 pass out before they can switch off the beam, draining the ship's power and preventing its own retros from firing.

With the news media now reporting that Thunderbird 3 is heading for the Sun, Jeff (voiced by Peter Dyneley) alerts Virgil and Brains, who hurry back to Thunderbird 2 to calculate the frequency needed to fire Thunderbird 3s retros. Opening a storage box meant for International Rescue's portable computer, they are dismayed to find that they have accidentally packed Braman instead. However, Braman is able to calculate the frequency on his own and Virgil and Brains succeed in firing Thunderbird 3s retros. Back on Tracy Island, the International Rescue team thank Brains and Braman for their efforts.

Production
"Sun Probe" was the fourth episode of Thunderbirds to enter production. The story was devised by Gerry Anderson as a means of introducing Thunderbird 3, which had not been featured in any of the early scripts for the series. "Sun Probe" marks the first vocal contributions of Matt Zimmerman (the voice of Alan Tracy) to the series.

Originally filmed as a 25-minute episode in late 1964, "Sun Probe" was lengthened to 50 minutes in January 1965 to satisfy APF's sponsor Lew Grade, who had been impressed with the pilot episode and ordered that all episodes of Thunderbirds be extended to fill a one-hour timeslot. Anderson, Alan Pattillo and Tony Barwick expanded Alan Fennell's original storyline by adding the subplot of Thunderbird 2s mission to Mount Arkan and the plot twists involving the failure of Thunderbird 3s retro-rockets and Virgil and Brains' discovery that they have taken Braman with them. The newly-written material also included a scene in which Brains and Braman play chess on Tracy Island and another that sees Harris, Asher and Camp preparing for blast-off at Cape Kennedy.

The new scenes were shot between the filming of "30 Minutes After Noon" and "The Impostors" and alongside that of "The Uninvited"; "Sun Probe" and "The Uninvited" were the first episodes of Thunderbirds to be extended. The re-shoots required the Thunderbird 3 and Cape Kennedy control room sets to be re-built from scratch. The chess scene was filmed in the Tracy Villa lounge instead of Brains' laboratory as the latter set was considered too detailed to re-create accurately. The Transmitter Truck model is a modified version of the explosives tractor seen in "End of the Road".

Anderson was displeased with the scenes of Sun Probe approaching the Sun and instructed the episode's sound editor to amplify the accompanying sound effects. He believed that Barry Gray's musical score, composed partly of material originally recorded for Fireball XL5, compensated for the lack of action and greatly improved the episode.

Some shots of the Sun Probe launch were duplicated for the opening scenes of "The Perils of Penelope", whose extending material was recorded back-to-back with "Sun Probe". The Thunderbird 3 launch sequence, devised by special effects director Derek Meddings, was recycled for "The Uninvited", "The Impostors", "Danger at Ocean Deep" and the series finale, "Give or Take a Million". The Braman puppet also appears in "Edge of Impact" and "30 Minutes After Noon" (in the latter episode, as the plutonium store guards).

The 1969 film Doppelgänger, which Gerry and Sylvia Anderson produced and co-wrote, also features a spacecraft called Sun Probe.

Broadcast and reception
"Sun Probe" was broadcast as the 11th episode of Thunderbirds for both the series' original run and most of its 1960s re-runs. Over five million people watched the episode on 11 October 1991 when it had its first network broadcast on BBC2, making it the channel's fourth most-watched programme of the week.

Critical response
Sylvia Anderson praised the special effects but characterised the episode in general as "too much space and too many machines for my taste" and a "boys' own adventure" lacking femininity.

Chris Bentley, author of The Complete Book of Thunderbirds responds positively to the episode, writing that it "successfully" showcases Thunderbird 3; John Marriott, author of Thunderbirds Are Go!, considers it melodramatic and "one of the most edge-of-the-sofa" episodes of the series. Marcus Hearn, author of Thunderbirds: The Vault, describes it as "nerve-wracking ... skilfully extended from its original 25-minute running time" and praises the substantial roles given to the "sometimes neglected" characters of Brains and Tin-Tin; he also compliments the mildly comic relationship between Brains and Braman. Nevertheless, he calls the Sun itself "probably the series' weakest special effect".

Tom Fox of Starburst magazine also gives a favourable review, writing that although "Sun Probe" features the series' "most drawn-out conclusion ever", it remains a "very busy" episode. Praising the roles of Brains, Alan and Tin-Tin, the portrayal of the astronauts' deliriousness and the "novel twist" of the malfunction on Thunderbird 3, he sums up the episode as a "good, slow-burning one" and awards a rating of four out of five stars.

Matthew Dennis of the website CultBox describes "Sun Probe" as "terrific stuff" and ranks it as one of the best episodes of Thunderbirds, noting its drama and suspense. David Gutierrez of DVD Verdict gives a rating of 85 out of 100.

Adaptations
The clip show episode "Security Hazard" features a flashback to "Sun Probe". In 1966, an adaptation of the soundtrack, featuring newly-recorded narration by Matt Zimmerman as Alan, was released by Century 21 Records on the vinyl EP  Thunderbird 3 (code MA 112).

In 1981, the New York offices of ITC Entertainment combined "Sun Probe" with another space adventure – Series Two's "Ricochet" – to create Thunderbirds In Outer Space, one of three Thunderbirds compilation films that were sold to the American cable TV market in the early 1980s under the promotional banner "Super Space Theater".

In 1991, the episode was serialised by Alan Fennell and Malcolm Stokes over three issues of Thunderbirds: The Comic. The following year, a novelisation by Dave Morris was published by Young Corgi.

In 1994, "Sun Probe" was broadcast on Fox Network in the United States as an episode of Thunderbirds Are Go! – a series comprising re-edited versions of 13 of the original episodes, complete with new soundtracks. After further modifications, the re-edit aired on UPN in 1995 as an episode of Turbocharged Thunderbirds.

"Sun Probe" was later remade as "Slingshot", an episode of the remake series Thunderbirds Are Go.

References

Works cited

External links

1965 British television episodes
Fiction about the Sun
Himalayas in fiction
Television episodes about robots
Television episodes set in Florida
Television episodes set in outer space
Thunderbirds (TV series) episodes
Works about astronauts